Abode318 is a residential skyscraper developed by PDG Corporation and Schiavello and designed by Elenberg Fraser and Disegno Australia in Melbourne, Victoria, Australia. , the skyscraper is the 22nd–tallest building in Melbourne.

Initially proposed in 2007, and named the Barton Tower, the skyscraper anticipated the current trend of "skinny skyscrapers" proposed in Melbourne. Indeed, the most unusual feature of the building is its "curving exterior" which is illuminated by 10 millimetres of rose coloured glass, which incorporates thermal properties that insulate the skyscraper. The project received approval by then-Planning Minister Matthew Guy in 2011, with construction commencing later that year. At a cost of AUD$136 million, the building topped-out in late 2014, and was completed by early 2015. At the time of its completion, Abode318 was the 10th–tallest building in Melbourne; additionally, it became the first building since the 2006 completion of the Eureka Tower to be listed in the "ten-tallest buildings of Melbourne".

See also 
List of tallest buildings in Melbourne
List of tallest buildings in Australia

References

External links 
Abode318

Skyscrapers in Melbourne
Residential skyscrapers in Australia
Residential buildings completed in 2015
Apartment buildings in Melbourne
2015 establishments in Australia
Buildings and structures in Melbourne City Centre